The Red is an epithet which may refer to:

Daniel Cohn-Bendit or Dany le rouge (the red) (born 1945), German politician
Erik the Red (950–c. 1003), founder of the first Nordic settlement in Greenland
Håkan the Red, a king of Sweden in the second half of the 11th century
Hector Roy Mackenzie (died 1528), progenitor of the Mackenzies of Gairloch
Hugh of Sully, 13th century general under the Sicilian King Charles of Anjou, nicknamed "le Rousseau" ("the Red")
John Comyn III of Badenoch (c. 1274–1306), Scottish nobleman
Odo I, Duke of Burgundy (1060–1102)
Thorstein the Red, a Viking chieftain in late ninth-century Scotland

See also
List of people known as the Black
List of people known as the White

Lists of people by epithet